Prior to the amendment of Tamil Nadu Entertainments Tax Act 1939 on 1 April 1958, Gross was 133.33 per cent of Nett for all films.

The following is a list of films produced in the Tamil film industry in India in 1953, in alphabetical order.

1953

Dubbed films

References 

Films, Tamil
Lists of 1953 films by country or language
1953
1950s Tamil-language films